Skaneateles Creek is a river in New York, the United States. It drains Skaneateles Lake to the Seneca River. It flows through Skaneateles, Skaneateles Falls, Mottville, Elbridge, and Jordan before joining the Seneca River, about 2 miles northwest of Jordan, New York.

Though only approximately only 10 miles long, Skaneateles Creek has 21 dams inventoried by the New York State Department of Environmental Conservation.

The Erie Canal crossed over Skaneateles Creek on the Jordan Aqueduct.

References

Rivers of New York (state)
Rivers of Onondaga County, New York